Tsai Lan-chin ( (15 November 1964 – 14 February 1987) was a Taiwanese singer and songwriter.

Early life 
As a child, he showed a talent for music and painting. He started learning piano at the age of 6. He attended Taipei Municipal Jianguo High School and studied mechanical engineering at National Taiwan University.

Due to poor health, he took a leave of absence during his first year. He briefly attended Pingtung Extension School of Agriculture before returning to NTU.

Career 
He began writing songs and performing at concerts at the age of 21. His only album, 這個世界 (zhè gè shìjiè – This World), was released posthumously.

Legacy 
Despite releasing only one album, his songs are still remembered in Taiwan even 20 years after his death. The song This World 這個世界 has been covered by various artists such as Deserts Chang, Mayday, and Stefanie Sun.

Death 
Due to poor health, he died at the age of 22 at National Taiwan University Hospital from a heart attack.

References

External links
 Official Fan Website

Taiwanese singer-songwriters
20th-century Taiwanese male singers
1964 births
1987 deaths